Maxim Kabatskiy (born December 23, 1996) is a Russian sports shooter.

References

1996 births
Living people
Russian male sport shooters
Shooters at the 2020 Summer Olympics
Sportspeople from Moscow
Olympic shooters of Russia